Ropica assamensis is a species of beetle in the family Cerambycidae. It was described by Breuning in 1971.

References

assamensis
Beetles described in 1971